William D. Reynolds (1867–1951) was an American Southern Presbyterian (PCUS) missionary and Bible translator in Korea.

William Davis Reynolds was born 12 November 1867. He received his undergraduate education at Hampden-Sydney College in Virginia and subsequently studied theology at Union Presbyterian Seminary. He completed the first translation of the Old Testament into Korean in 1910.

Along with Horace G. Underwood, James Scarth Gale, Henry G. Appenzeller, William B. Scranton, Lee Seung Doo (이승두), and Kim Jeong Sam (김정삼), Reynolds and the team's efforts led to the first Korean translation of the New Testament and the first Korean Hymnal.

From 1917-1937 he was professor in Systematic Theology and Biblical Languages at Pyongyang Presbyterian Theological Seminary.

References

External links
 

History of Korea
1867 births
1951 deaths
Translators of the Bible into Korean
American Presbyterian missionaries
Presbyterian missionaries in Korea
People from Pyongyang
Hampden–Sydney College alumni
Union Presbyterian Seminary alumni
American expatriates in Korea
Missionary linguists